The 1959 National Invitation Tournament was the 1959 edition of the annual NCAA college basketball competition.

Selected teams
Below is a list of the 12 teams selected for the tournament.

Bracket
Below is the tournament bracket.

See also
 1959 NCAA University Division basketball tournament
 1959 NCAA College Division basketball tournament
 1959 NAIA Division I men's basketball tournament

References

National Invitation Tournament
National Invitation Tournament
1950s in Manhattan
Basketball in New York City
College sports in New York City
Madison Square Garden
National Invitation Tournament
National Invitation Tournament
Sports competitions in New York City
Sports in Manhattan